The following is a list of ambassadors of France to Lebanon.

See also
 France–Lebanon relations

References

 
France
Lebanon